The Sarajevo National Theatre (Bosnian and Serbian: Narodno pozorište Sarajevo, Народно позориште Сарајево, Croatian: Narodno kazalište Sarajevo) was founded in November 1921.

The opening ceremony was led by Branislav Nušić, then Head of the Art Department of the Ministry of Education. On November 9, 1946, the Sarajevo Opera House commenced its artistic activity with the premiere of B. Smetana's The Bartered Bride.

The Sarajevo Ballet was also founded in 1946, but its first independent performance, The Harvest by B. Papandopulo, was postponed until May 25, 1950. This performance marked the beginning of its professional development within the national Theatre.

The building was designed by architect Karel Pařík, who designed over 160 other buildings in Sarajevo.

References

1921 establishments in Bosnia and Herzegovina
Theatres in Bosnia and Herzegovina
Opera in Bosnia and Herzegovina
Buildings and structures in Sarajevo
Culture in Sarajevo
Tourist attractions in Sarajevo
National theatres
National Monuments of Bosnia and Herzegovina